Amu Darya electoral district was a constituency created for the 1917 Russian Constituent Assembly election. One seat was allotted to the district. The electoral district covered the Amu Darya Division of the Syr-Darya Oblast. According to U.S. historian Oliver Henry Radkey, it is not known whether voting took place. Per Wade (2004), it is certain that no election took place in Amu Darya.

In the autumn of 1917, a meeting of the Muslim National Committee and the Musavat Party had decided to field Nasib Yusifbeyli as their candidate in Amu Darya.

References

Electoral districts of the Russian Constituent Assembly election, 1917